Brown Low is a bowl barrow most likely dating to the Bronze Age. An earth and stone mound survives east of Marple, Greater Manchester. It is listed as a Scheduled Ancient Monument. The mound was partially excavated by the Rev William Marriott in 1809, who discovered fragments of burnt stones and cremated bones, as well as a preserved acorn. Marriott also describes the finding of a funerary urn in an adjacent barrow during an unauthorised excavation. Brown Low is on private land, just east of a public footpath running off Sandy Lane.

See also
Scheduled Monuments in Greater Manchester

References

Buildings and structures in the Metropolitan Borough of Stockport
Scheduled monuments in Greater Manchester